Rizalia is a genus of fungi in the family Trichosphaeriaceae.

References

Sordariomycetes genera
Trichosphaeriales